Zamin Ferrous is a privately owned mining company owned and run by the Indian former billionaire, Pramod Agarwal.

Zamin is in a protracted legal dispute with Eurasian Natural Resources Corporation over a Bahia, Brazil iron ore mine.

References

External links

Mining companies of India